Reverence  is the second studio album by Cameroonian jazz bassist and musician Richard Bona. It was released on September 7, 2001, through Columbia Jazz. The song "Reverence (The Story of a Miracle)" features guest appearance by prominent jazz guitarist Pat Metheny.

In her review of the album, Hilarie Grey of JazzTimes called Reverence "a warm and often touching effort that should cement Richard Bona's reputation as one of the great talents of our time."

Track listing

Personnel
 Richard Bona – vocals, bass guitar, flute, percussion, keyboards, electric guitar, acoustic guitar

 Jimmy Hynes – trumpet
 Michael Davis – trombone, brass arrangement
 Aaron Heick – alto and tenor saxophone
 Oz Noy – wah wah guitar
 Etienne Stadwijk – keyboards, Rhodes piano, piano
 Vinnie Colaiuta – drums
 Eriko Sato – violin
 Shmuel Katz – violin
 Louise Schulman – viola
 David Cerutti – viola
 Richard Locker – cello
 Maxime Neumann – cello

 Alan Cox – flute
 Sheryl Henze – bass flute
 John Moses – bass clarinet
 Martin Kuuskmann – bassoon
 Grace Paradise – harp
 Ari Hoenig – drums
 Gil Goldstein – orchestration, strings arrangement
 Edsel Gomes – piano
 Luisito Quintero – percussion
 Pat Metheny – acoustic guitar
 George Whitty – piano, keyboards
 Michael Brecker – tenor saxophone

Chart performance

References

Richard Bona albums
2001 albums